Žlkovce is a village and municipality in Hlohovec District in the Trnava Region of western Slovakia.

History
In historical records the village was first mentioned in 1229.

Geography
The municipality lies at an altitude of 145 metres and covers an area of 7.939 km². It has a population of about 648 people.

References

External links
 
 
 http://www.statistics.sk/mosmis/eng/run.html

Villages and municipalities in Hlohovec District